These are the official results of the Men's shot put event at the 1986 European Championships in Stuttgart, West Germany, held at Neckarstadion on 27 and 28 August 1986.

Medalists

Results

Final
28 August

Qualification
27 August

Participation
According to an unofficial count, 16 athletes from 11 countries participated in the event.

 (1)
 (2)
 (2)
 (1)
 (1)
 (3)
 (1)
 (1)
 (1)
 (2)
 (1)

See also
 1983 Men's World Championships Shot Put (Helsinki)
 1984 Men's Olympic Shot Put (Los Angeles)
 1986 Shot Put Year Ranking
 1987 Men's World Championships Shot Put (Rome)
 1988 Men's Olympic Shot Put (Seoul)

References

 Results

Shot put
Shot put at the European Athletics Championships